Larry James Walton (born February 8, 1947) is a former American football wide receiver.  He played eight years in the National Football League for the Detroit Lions (1969-1974 and 1976) and Buffalo Bills (1978). His best seasons were from 1970 to 1972 when he caught 84 passes for 1,508 yards and 16 touchdowns.  He missed the 1975 season after undergoing knee surgery.  He was cut by the Lions on September 12, 1977, later attempting a comeback with the Bills in 1978.

Walton was born in Johnstown, Pennsylvania, in 1947.  He played college football at Trinidad State Junior College in Colorado and at Arizona State University. In November 1967, he tied a Western Athletic Conference record with four touchdowns (three rushing, one receiving) in a game. He gained 719 yards for Arizona State in 1968.

References

1947 births
Living people
Sportspeople from Johnstown, Pennsylvania
American football wide receivers
Players of American football from Pennsylvania
Arizona State Sun Devils football players
Detroit Lions players
Buffalo Bills players